Milton Bernard Thompson (born January 5, 1959), is an American former professional baseball outfielder, pinch hitter, and coach, who played in Major League Baseball (MLB) for the Atlanta Braves, Philadelphia Phillies, St. Louis Cardinals, Houston Astros, Los Angeles Dodgers, and Colorado Rockies. He returned as the Cincinnati Reds’ minor league hitting instructor, for the  season. Over his MLB career, Thompson compiled a batting average of .274.

Major league career
The Atlanta Braves drafted Thompson in the 2nd round (29th overall) of the 1979 draft, out of Howard University. After two years in Atlanta, as a part-time left fielder, the Braves traded Thompson, along with Steve Bedrosian, to the Phillies, for Ozzie Virgil and Pete Smith. Thompson continued to impress, batting .251, .302, and .288, respectively, in his three seasons in Philadelphia.

Following the  season, Thompson was granted free agency and elected to return to the Phillies.

As a key component in the Phillies’ unexpected, last-to-first 1993 National League Championship team, Thompson platooned in left field with Pete Incaviglia, in the World Series, against the Toronto Blue Jays. He remained an ever-popular fan favorite, while having another stellar season.

Perhaps Thompson's greatest MLB performance came on April 29, 1993. That day, the Phillies left fielder really "brought his 'A' Game" to the San Diego Padres’ Jack Murphy Stadium. He had already gone 3-for-4 at the plate (3 singles), with 2 runs batted in (RBI), and one run scored. Then, crowning his day — and quite possibly his big league career: With the game on the line and the Phillies ahead 5-3, in the bottom of the eighth inning and two out, the Padres had the bases loaded, bringing their slugging right-handed catcher, Bob Geren, to the plate. The fleet-footed Thompson arrived just in time, planted his feet, and made a surreal leap – seemingly sensing in some sort of inexact prayer, where the ball was – and cradled it into his glove's web, retiring the side and preserving another Phillies win, in that magical 1993 season, high-fiving center fielder Lenny Dykstra all the way to the visiting dugout.

On July 31, 1994, Thompson was traded by Philadelphia, to the Houston Astros, for pitcher Tom Edens. Again, following the  season, Thompson was granted free agency, after being with the Astros for only a short time. As a free agent, he elected to re-sign with Houston, for another year. After the  season, Thompson was again a free agent, and signed with the Los Angeles Dodgers; on June 27, 1996, he was selected off waivers by the Colorado Rockies. His career with the Rockies lasted just over 5 weeks, as Thompson received his unconditional release on August 2, 1996, thus ending his big league playing career.

Coaching
In 1997, Thompson became the minor league outfield/base-running coordinator in the Tampa Bay Devil Rays organization. In 1998, he joined the Phillies as a minor league coach. Thompson lasted there for two seasons, until taking 2000 off, then returned as a minor league base-running/outfield coordinator, again in the Phillies farm system.

In 2004, Thompson joined the major league Phillies staff as first base coach. The next year, he became the team's hitting coach, where he remained for five-plus seasons. During Thompson's tenure as batting coach, the Phillies have led the league twice in runs scored, even though they have alternated between only 2nd and 3rd place in their respective division due to pitching difficulties. He was one of the few coaches not fired by the organization in 2005. As the hitting coach of the 2008 World Champion Philadelphia Phillies, Thompson earned the first World Series ring of his long career in baseball. He would return to the World Series in 2009, where the Phillies lost to the New York Yankees, in six games.

Having played for the 1993 National League Champions, Thompson joined Larry Bowa and John Vukovich as the only Phillies in franchise history to go to the World Series as both a player and coach for the club.

On Thursday, July 22, 2010, Thompson was relieved of his duties as the Phillies’ hitting coach, being replaced by former Minor League hitting coach Greg Gross. Thompson was hired by the Astros that November, as their minor league outfield/base-running coordinator.

Personal life
Thompson has four daughters. He resides in Washington Township, Gloucester County, New Jersey, with his family.

Trivia
 Hit .313 with 6 RBI in 1993 World Series and set a Phillies record with 5 RBI in Game 4 at Veterans Stadium.
 Attended Colonel Zadok A. Magruder High School and Howard University
 Graduated from high school in 1977, where, among playing baseball, he played football and ran track
 Is well known for his incredible feats in left field during the early 1990s, including catching several balls over the fence. One famous play took place on April 29, 1993, in the bottom of the eighth inning against the Padres, with the Phillies up by 2, and the bases loaded, with two outs.  Thompson robbed the Padres of a grand slam, to end the inning, snatching a ball back, from over the wall.
 Resides in Sewell, NJ (Washington Twp., Gloucester Cty.)
 Now with the Reds, as a minor league hitting instructor.

See also
 List of Major League Baseball career stolen bases leaders

References

External links

Milt Thompson at Baseball Gauge
Milt Thompson at Astros Daily

Living people
1959 births
African-American baseball coaches
African-American baseball players
Atlanta Braves players
Baseball players from Washington, D.C.
Baseball players from Philadelphia
Colorado Rockies players
Durham Bulls players
Greenwood Braves players
Houston Astros players
Howard Bison baseball players
Kingsport Braves players
Los Angeles Dodgers players
Major League Baseball first base coaches
Major League Baseball hitting coaches
Major League Baseball left fielders
People from Washington Township, Gloucester County, New Jersey
Philadelphia Phillies coaches
Philadelphia Phillies players
Portland Beavers players
Richmond Braves players
St. Louis Cardinals players
Savannah Braves players
Baseball coaches from Washington, D.C.
Tampa Bay Devil Rays coaches
21st-century African-American people
20th-century African-American sportspeople